Shan Masood (Urdu, Punjabi: شان مسعود; born 14 October 1989) is a Pakistani international cricketer. He plays for Yorkshire County Cricket Club, and the Multan Sultans in domestic cricket. He is a left-handed batter and an occasional right-arm medium-fast bowler.

In August 2018, he was one of thirty-three players to be awarded a central contract for the 2018–19 season by the Pakistan Cricket Board (PCB). He has also served as the captain of Multan Sultans and Southern Punjab Cricket Team. Currently, he is the appointed captain of the Yorkshire County Cricket Club for the 2023 County season. He was part of the Pakistan Cricket Team's squad that finished 2nd at the ICC WORLD T20 2022.

Early life and education
He was born in 1989 in Kuwait, where his father worked in a bank. Following the Iraqi invasion of Kuwait and the start of the Gulf War, the family left for their native Pakistan, settling down in Karachi again.

His father Mansoor Masood Khan, apart from being a professional banker, always had an interest in sports, himself playing hockey at provincial level while loving cricket as well and encouraging his son to be invested in the field. Mansoor became a member of the governing board in the Pakistan Cricket Board in 2014.

His paternal uncle Waqar Masood Khan is a retired civil servant specialized in Islamic economics who has worked in Imran Khan's cabinet as a special assistant for finance and revenue during 2020-2021, his elder sister died in 2021 while his younger brother Ali is a barrister.

After moving to the United Kingdom with his parents, he studied at Stamford School, Lincolnshire and then Durham University where he studied economics. He studied Management and Sports Sciences at Loughborough University through a distance learning programme.

Domestic career

In his first-class debut in the 2007 season, Masood scored 54 for Karachi as part of a 154-run opening stand with Asad Shafiq. He also played three first-class games for Durham University.

In April 2018, he was named the vice-captain of Khyber Pakhtunkhwa's squad for the 2018 Pakistan Cup.

In September 2019, Masood was named as the captain of Southern Punjab for the 2019–20 Quaid-e-Azam Trophy tournament.

He is captain of Bagh Stallions in the Kashmir Premier League.

In December 2021, he was signed by Derbyshire for the 2022 county season. In April 2022, in the second round of matches in the 2022 County Championship, Shan scored his maiden double century in first-class cricket, scoring an unbeaten 201 runs on the opening day against Sussex. In the following match, Shan scored another double century, becoming the first batter for Derbyshire to score back-to-back double centuries in first-class cricket. In May 2022, he scored his third century for Derbyshire against Worcestershire.

International career

Masood made 75 on Test debut against South Africa in October 2013. He scored his maiden century against Sri Lanka at Pallekele in July 2015, putting on 242 for the third wicket with Younis Khan as Pakistan successfully chased 382. Masood, a part-time medium pacer, bowled for the first time in Test cricket on 23 July 2016 against England at Old Trafford. His first delivery was a no ball.

In September 2018, he was named in Pakistan's One Day International (ODI) squad for the 2018 Asia Cup, but he did not play. In January 2019, he was named in Pakistan's ODI squad for their series against South Africa, but again he did not play. In March 2019, he was named in Pakistan's ODI squad for their series against Australia. He made his ODI debut for Pakistan against Australia on 22 March 2019.

In December 2019, he scored his second Test century, against the touring Sri Lankans at the National Stadium, Karachi. In the same match, he also scored his 1,000th run in Test cricket.

In February 2020, Masood made his third Test century, against Bangladesh at Rawalpindi. In June 2020, he was named in a 29-man squad for Pakistan's tour to England during the COVID-19 pandemic. In July, he was shortlisted in Pakistan's 20-man squad for the Test matches against England. In November 2020, he was named in Pakistan's 35-man squad for their tour to New Zealand.

In September 2022, he was named in the Pakistan's T20I squad for the series against England. He made his T20I debut on 20 September 2022, against England.

In January 2023, he was named as the vice-captain of the Pakistan's ODI team for their home series against New Zealand.

See also
 List of Test cricketers born in non-Test playing nations

References

External links
 

1989 births
Living people
Pakistani cricketers
Pakistan Test cricketers
Pakistan One Day International cricketers
Pakistan Twenty20 International cricketers
Habib Bank Limited cricketers
Islamabad cricketers
People educated at Stamford School
Alumni of Durham University
Durham MCCU cricketers
Karachi Whites cricketers
Karachi Zebras cricketers
Federal Areas cricketers
Islamabad Leopards cricketers
Multan Sultans cricketers
Pakistani expatriates in England
Pakistani expatriates in Kuwait
Sportspeople from Kuwait City
Alumni of Loughborough University
Southern Punjab (Pakistan) cricketers